Cammeray is a residential suburb located five kilometres north of the Sydney Central Business District (CBD) and is part of the North Sydney Council local government area. Cammeray is part of the Lower North Shore region of Northern Sydney.

History

Aboriginal culture 
Cammeray takes its name from the Cammeraygal people, an Aboriginal clan who once occupied the Lower North Shore. Radiometric dating (carbon dating) indicates that indigenous peoples lived in the Cammeray area at least 5,800 years ago and Aboriginal shell middens have been discovered at Folly Point and cave paintings in Primrose Park.

European settlement 
Prior to the 1920s, the suburb was known as Suspension Bridge reflecting the now Long Gully Bridge that joined Northbridge to Cammeray. Cammeray was slow to develop mainly due to its steep topography and remoteness from transport.

Despite the land boom of the 1880s and plans for a suspension bridge across Flat Rock Creek, development in the Cammeray area was mostly confined to the south of the suburb  with some boatmen‟s houses on Folly Point. The rest of the district was very rural consisting of bushland, dairies and market gardens. Cammeray was also the site of Sydney's first quarry, with sandstone blocks from the quarry making many of the first buildings in Sydney town.

An Australian politician and solicitor, Joseph Palmer Abbott, built Tarella, a two-storey Italianate mansion in Amherst Street, c. 1886, on land he had acquired in 1881. Palmer Street in Cammeray was named after him. Tarella includes a coachhouse at the rear, with a distinctive clock tower. It is listed with the Heritage Council of New South Wales.

In 1892, a suspension bridge was built as a private initiative by the North Sydney Investment and Tramway Company, to attract buyers for new residential allotments on the north side of Long Bay. In 1914, the first tram crossed the bridge, conveniently linking the new suburb and beautiful Middle Harbour peninsulas to the more developed parts of North Sydney. Land sales revived in 1909 when the tramway along Miller Street was built, with a string of subdivisions opening up, including the Bell's Estate (1909). In the mid 1930s faults were discovered in the bridge's steel cables and anchorages in the rock below so public transport was interrupted with passengers having to walk across the bridge as trams waited on either side.

Estates established in the 1920s and 30s included the Morning Glow Estate (1921), Cammeray Estate (1932) and Green's Estate (1935).  By the 1940s motor transport made the area more accessible and many waterfront houses were built. The last substantial subdivision in Cammeray was of the "Three Oaks Dairy‟ in 1942. It is recorded, however, that as late as 1958 dairy cattle still grazed at Cammeray.

Development 
In the 1960s Cammeray's residential progress was interrupted when the Warringah Expressway cut through most of North Sydney including Cammeray. Portions of St Thomas' Cemetery and Cammeray Park were resumed, as well as numerous houses, particularly in the area between Falcon and Amherst Streets. The Warringah Expressway also divides Cammeray, with the only crossing points being at West, Miller, Ernest and Falcon Streets.

Amherst Street was named after William Pitt Amherst, who was Governor-General of India from 1823 to 1828. Heritage listings include Tarella at 3 Amherst Street and the Cammeray Substation at 143 Bellevue Street.

Demographics
According to the 2016 census of Population, there were 7,006 residents in Cammeray. In Cammeray, 63.6% of people were born in Australia. The most common countries of birth were England 6.6%, New Zealand 2.8%, South Africa 1.7%, India 1.5% and China 1.4%. 78.6% of people only spoke English at home. The next most common language spoken at home was Mandarin at 1.7%. 
The most common responses for religion in Cammeray were No Religion 36.6%, Catholic 24.5% and Anglican 14.2%.

Commercial area
Miller Street is the main commercial thoroughfare of Cammeray with restaurants, cafes, the local post office, a petrol station and small businesses.  Cammeray Square is a modern shopping and residential complex on Miller Street, and adjacent to Green Park on Cammeray Road is a small business precinct giving the local area a village feel.

Transport
With close proximity to the Sydney CBD and the Warringah expressway Cammeray's location provides easy private and public access to all directions.  Public transport is provided by bus with Cammeray being the last south-bound stop for services to the Sydney CBD via the Warringah Freeway. Buses to North Sydney, Milsons Point and Crows Nest are also available.

Schools
Cammeray has two public schools catering for students from Kindergarten to Year 6.  Cammeray Public School is situated on the northern side of the suburb and Anzac Park Public School, which opened in 2016, is located more to the south.

Churches
All Saints' Anglican church on Carter Street is the only church in Cammeray.  It is part of the Naremburn Cammeray Anglican Church.

Residential
Cammeray has a mix of private and public apartments and dwellings with 75.8% medium and high density in 2016.  23.3% of all dwellings were separate houses; 35.5% were medium density dwellings and 40.2% were in high density dwellings, compared with 10.2%, 25.0%, and 64.2% in the North Sydney Council area respectively.

Parks and recreation

Cammeray offers a range of sports facilities and open spaces, and the surrounding natural bushland and Middle Harbour provides for bushwalking and boating activities.  
 
Tunks Park is a large recreation and sporting area that is surrounded by bushland with Middle Harbour to the east. It provides open space, walking tracks, playground and picnic areas and has three sporting fields that are used for cricket during the summer and soccer and rugby during the winter. It is a popular exercise and dog walking area with bushwalking tracks that lead towards Naremburn to the west and Northbridge to the north. A small public boat ramp allows small boats to enter Middle Harbour.

Cammeray Park is a large green space at the southern part of Cammeray, that offers an all year round synthetic turf field for soccer and rugby. It is surrounded by private tennis courts, a skate park, a cricket field. It also contains Cammeray Golf Club, which is a 9-hole public course.

Green Park is an urban open grass area that is used for recreational activities and dog walking. It also has two public tennis courts and a child care centre.

Anzac Park is a smaller open space that is mainly used for picnicking and dog walking and has a large community garden. The western area houses a grove of turpentine trees with plaques that surround North Sydney War Memorial that represent the Australian service women and men who participated in various theatres during World War II.

Several cycling paths exist in Cammeray, including paths that connect to Chatswood via The Artarmon Link Path (Cordia Way), and to Sydney CBD via the Harbour Bridge.

References

External links

 Cammeray - community profile
 Photos of Cammerary

 
Suburbs of Sydney
North Sydney Council